Albanian National Alliance Party (in Albanian: Partia Aleanca Nacionale Shqiptare) is a political party in Albania led by Eduart Perjaku. The party was recognized by the Electoral Commission in 2003.

References 

Political parties in Albania